In the United Kingdom, land based colleges are colleges specialising in agriculture, horticulture, and other topics useful for rural economies. Most land based colleges are members of Landex, which promotes and coordinates the colleges.

List of rural colleges in the UK

England

Askham Bryan College in Askham Bryan, North Yorkshire
Berkshire College of Agriculture in Burchetts Green, Berkshire
Bicton College in Budleigh Salterton, Devon
Bishop Burton College in Bishop Burton, East Riding of Yorkshire
Brooksby Melton College in Melton Mowbray, Leicestershire
Capel Manor College in Bulls Cross, London Borough of Enfield
College of West Anglia in Cambridgeshire
Easton College in Norfolk
Hadlow College in Hadlow, Kent
Hartpury College in Hartpury, Gloucestershire
Houghall College in Houghall, County Durham
Kingston Maurward College in Dorchester, Dorset
Merrist Wood College in Worplesdon, Surrey
Moulton College in Moulton, Northamptonshire
Myerscough College in Bilsborrow, Lancashire
Newton Rigg College in Penrith, Cumbria, part of Askham Bryan College
Plumpton College in Plumpton, East Sussex
Reaseheath College in Nantwich, Cheshire
Riseholme College in Lincolnshire
Royal Agricultural College in Cirencester, Gloucestershire
Shuttleworth College (Bedfordshire) in Old Warden
Sparsholt College in Sparsholt, Hampshire
South Staffordshire College specifically Rodbaston College based in Penkridge, Staffordshire
Suffolk Rural College in Otley, Suffolk
Walford Campus in Baschurch, Shropshire
Wiltshire College Lackham, near Chippenham
Writtle University College in Chelmsford, Essex

Northern Ireland
College of Agriculture, Food and Rural Enterprise

Scotland
Scotland's Rural College

Notes

 
Lists of universities and colleges in the United Kingdom